Government Plaza can refer to:

Government Plaza, Binghamton, a government office complex in Binghamton, New York, USA.
Government Plaza station, a light rail station in Minneapolis, Minnesota, USA.
Government Campus Plaza, a government complex in Port of Spain, Trinidad and Tobago.
Mobile Government Plaza, a government complex in Mobile, Alabama, USA.

See also
Government Center (disambiguation)